María Elsa Viteri (25 February 1965 – 18 November 2021) was an Ecuadorian economist and politician. She served as Minister of Finance from 2008 to 2010 and again in 2018. Viteri died on 18 November 2021 after a battle with pancreatic cancer.

References

1965 births
2021 deaths
21st-century Ecuadorian politicians
21st-century Ecuadorian women politicians
Ecuadorian Ministers of Finance
Women government ministers of Ecuador
Ecuadorian women economists
People from Guayaquil
Deaths from pancreatic cancer
Deaths from cancer in Ecuador
20th-century Ecuadorian economists
21st-century Ecuadorian economists
Female finance ministers
20th-century Ecuadorian women